Four corner fusion, or partial wrist arthrodesis, is a procedure which involves resection/removal of the scaphoid bone and fixation of the remaining wrist bones with a plate or wires. The procedure is usually performed due to wrist arthritis or due to scaphoid collapse. This surgical intervention is often needed as treatment for patients with wrist osteoarthritis.

See also
 Preiser disease

References

Orthopedic surgical procedures